Wahkiakum County may refer to:

Places
Wahkiakum County, Washington

Ships
USS Wahkiakum County (LST-1162), a United States Navy landing ship tank in commission from 1953 to 1970
USNS Wahkiakum County (T-LST-1162), a United States Navy tank landing ship in non-commissioned service in the Military Sealift Command from 1972 to 1973 which had previously been in commission as USS Wahkiakum County (LST-1162)